Cryptanthus seidelianus (common name: Earth star) is a plant species in the genus Cryptanthus. This species is endemic to Brazil.

References

seidelianus
Flora of Brazil